The city of Worcester, Massachusetts consists of six regions: North Worcester, West Side, East Side, Central City, Downtown, and South Worcester. It can be further subdivided into smaller neighborhoods:

Others:
 Sunderland/Massasoit Road/Rice Square spans Union Hill, Grafton Hill, and Broadmeadow Brook.
 Lake Avenue/Quinsigamond Lake spans several neighborhoods in South Worcester and East Worcester.
 Park Ave skirts the eastern edge of West Worcester.
 The Edgemere neighborhood is primarily in neighboring Shrewsbury, Massachusetts.
 The Arts District spans several neighborhoods in Central City.

Photo gallery

Central

Downtown

East Side

North Worcester

South Worcester

West Side

References

 
Worcester